The Tar Heel League was a mid-20th century Class D level professional minor baseball league, based in North Carolina in the United States.

The first incarnation of the league began and ended the 1939 season with six clubs, but the following year saw the Shelby Nationals and Newton-Conover Twins — one third of the Tar Heel League — drop out on July 19, 1940. The entire league then shut down for 1941 and through World War II.

When the 1950s brought dwindling attendance to minor league baseball and clubs and leagues began to contract, the North Carolina State and Western Carolina leagues merged into a revived Tar Heel League for 1953. An unwieldy, ten–club circuit, the 1953 THL shed two teams on June 11 and relocated a third. The 1954 Tar Heel League could field only four teams, and it gave up the ghost 50 games into the season. The Western Carolina League returned to baseball in 1960, and still plays as the Class A level South Atlantic League.

Cities Represented 
Forest City, NC: Forest City Owls 1953–1954
Gastonia, NC: Gastonia Cardinals 1939–1940
Hickory, NC: Hickory Rebels 1939–1940, 1953–1954 
High Point, NC & Thomasville, NC: High Point-Thomasville Hi-Toms 1953
Lenoir, NC: Lenoir Indians 1939; Lenoir Reds 1940 
Lexington, NC: Lexington Indians 1953
Lincolnton, NC: Lincolnton Cardinals 1953
Marion, NC: Marion Marauders 1953–1954
Mooresville, NC: Mooresville Moors 1953
Newton, NC & Conover, NC: Newton-Conover Twins 1939–1940
Salisbury, NC: Salisbury Rocots 1953
Shelby, NC: Shelby Nationals 1939; Shelby Colonels 1940; Shelby Clippers 1953–1954
Statesville, NC: Statesville Owls 1939–1940; Statesville Blues 1953; Statesville Sports 1953

Yearly standings & statistics

1939 Tar Heel League
Playoffs: Gastonia 3 games, Shelby 1. Statesville 3 games, Lenoir 0. (1 tie.) Finals: Gastonia 4 games, Statesville 3.
Player statistics

1940 Tar Heel League
schedule
Newton-Conover and Shelby disbanded July 19. Playoffs: Hickory 3 games, Gastonia 0. Statesville 3 games, Lenoir 2. Finals: Statesville 4 games, Hickory 1.Player statistics

1953 Tar Heel League
schedule
High-Point-Thomasville & Statesville disbanded June 11.  Lincolnton moved to Statesville July 12.  Playoffs: Marion 4 games, Shelby 2. Lexington 4 games, Forest City 2. Finals: Lexington 4 games, Marion 2.
Player statistics

1954 Tar Heel League
schedule
 The League disbanded June 21.
Player statistics

References

1939 establishments in North Carolina
1954 disestablishments in North Carolina
Baseball leagues in North Carolina
Defunct minor baseball leagues in the United States
Sports leagues established in 1939
Sports leagues disestablished in 1954